Spyros Kouvelis (born in 1964 in Athens, Greece) is a Sustainability Expert and the former Deputy Minister of Foreign Affairs of Greece.

Early life
Spyros Kouvelis was born in 1964 in Athens, Greece. His origin is from Aitoloakarnania and Crete.

Early career

Spyros Kouvelis has a major in Economics from the Law School of the National and Kapodistrian University of Athens and a Masters of Science in Agricultural and Environmental Economics from the University of Reading, in Reading, Berkshire, U.K. He is fluent in English and French.

He started his career in 1991, working for the World Wildlife Fund for Nature as a Conservation Director. From 1995 until 1997 he served as a member of the Management Team directing the organization.
Spyros Kouvelis was a member of the Agriculture and European policy teams of World Wildlife Fund International, and chair of the WWF Mediterranean Team. He has also worked from Athens as a consultant to the WWF European Policy Office.

Since 2001, he held the position of MedWet Coordinator, directing the Mediterranean Wetlands Initiative Unit in Athens, a Ramsar outposted unit for the entire Mediterranean region.
He was president of the International Film and Visual Arts Festival of Rhodes – Ecofilms from 2007 until 2007.

Since May 2007 he joined the Mediterranean Action Plan of the United Nations Environment Programme, as officer in charge of the Mediterranean Commission on Sustainable Development and the implementation of the Mediterranean Strategy for Sustainable Development.

Politics
Spyros Kouvelis started his political career in 1997, when he was appointed as an Advisor to the Deputy Minister of Environment, Planning and Public Works of Greece, a post that he held until 2001.

He was elected as a member of the Hellenic Parliament with the Panhellenic Socialist Movement in the National Elections of September 2007. He was re-elected in the 2009 Greek legislative election and in October 2009, he was appointed his first position as a Deputy Minister for Foreign Affairs, responsible for Economic and Green Diplomacy, Development Cooperation, and Cultural Affairs. He left the post with the reshuffling of 2011.

In 2012, with his letter to the Speaker of the Hellenic Parliament he announced that he is becoming an Independent MP. Consequently, he did not run in the 2012 elections.

Sustainable Development
Spyros Kouvelis focused on Sustainable Development for the most part of his work career. After leaving politics in 2012, he collaborated closely with the Mediterranean Action Plan of the United Nations Environment Programme (UNEP/MAP), acting as Senior Expert for the review of the Mediterranean Strategy for Sustainable Development (MSSD) and the Action Plan for Sustainable Consumption and Production (SCP).

He also developed and applied with a team of experts the Simplified Peer Review methodology (SIMPEER) for the implementation of the Sustainable Development Strategy in Albania, Egypt, France, Montenegro, Morocco and Tunisia.

In 2017 he established the joint project on Sustainable Development and Governance between the Institute for Sustainability Leadership - CISL - of the University of Cambridge, and the European Public Law Organization - EPLO. The programme was transformed into the Institute for Sustainable Development of EPLO in 2019, of which he is the Director.

He is a Senior Associate of the Institute for Sustainability Leadership of the University of Cambridge since 2018.

Personal life

References
 Biography of Spyros Kouvelis 
  Biography of Spyros Kouvelis in the Official Website of the Hellenic Parliament

External links

 Official Website of M.P. Spyros Kouvelis 

Living people
1964 births
Politicians from Athens
PASOK politicians
Environment ministers of Greece
Foreign ministers of Greece
National and Kapodistrian University of Athens alumni
Alumni of the University of Reading
Greek MPs 2007–2009
Greek MPs 2009–2012